The SouthEastern Lacrosse Conference (SELC) is a lacrosse-only athletic conference affiliated with the Men's Collegiate Lacrosse Association (MCLA). The SELC incorporates teams in Alabama, Florida, Georgia, South Carolina, Tennessee, and is divided into two divisions, Division I and Division II. With 17 members, it is one of the largest of the MCLA's nine conferences. In 2021 several teams in the mid Atlantic region split off to create the Atlantic Lacrosse Conference.

About
The SouthEastern Lacrosse Conference (SELC) is a collegiate lacrosse club league based in the Southeastern United States. In 1988, the SELC was founded to provide for organized, regional college level lacrosse competition and to provide an outlet for high school players in the Southeast to play at the collegiate level. Since its inception, the SELC membership has expanded dramatically due to the explosive growth of high school and youth lacrosse in the Southeast.

The SELC has provided consistent collegiate competition among the member teams, produced viable team/player recognition awards and stages a first-class championship event. Additionally, the league is seeing successful high school players from the typical lacrosse base of the eastern seaboard come south for educational opportunities which have improved the quality of play of these teams.

Teams
Currently, 10 different teams are in the SELC Division I. All of the SELC DI teams are members of NCAA Division I. Currently the SELC DI league includes member schools from the Southeastern Conference (SEC), the Atlantic Coast Conference (ACC), and the American Athletic Conference (AAC). 7 institutions make up the SELC Division II League. The league comprises various collegiate athletics levels.

Championship History

Note: Bold Text indicates an MCLA National Championship winner

Note: Italic Text indicates an MCLA National Championship runner-up\

References

External links
SELC website
Official MCLA website
 Ga Southern website
 Citadel website
 UGA website
 Ga Tech website
 Auburn website
 Alabama website
 Kennesaw State website
 University of Florida
 UCF website
 UNF website
 USF website
 FGCU website
 FSU website
 FAU website
 FL Poly website
 University of South Carolina website
 University of Miami website
 Vanderbilt website

College lacrosse leagues in the United States